, also known as the Labour Conventions Reference, is a landmark decision of the Judicial Committee of the Privy Council concerning the distinct nature of federal and provincial jurisdiction in Canadian federalism.

Background

The federal treaty power
As part of the British North America Act, 1867, the Parliament of Canada was granted power to implement certain treaties:

During the 1920s, as a result of the growing political and diplomatic independence of the various Dominions of the Empire, the Balfour Declaration of 1926 stated that the United Kingdom and the Dominions were:

When Canada subsequently gained full independence following passage of the Statute of Westminster 1931, s. 132 was not amended to reflect its changed status.

The Labour Conventions
As a consequence of the Treaty of Versailles, the International Labour Organization was established, in which Canada became a member. Between 1919 and 1928, the ILO adopted several conventions, including:

 the Hours of Work (Industry) Convention, 1919,
 the Weekly Rest (Industry) Convention, 1921, and
 the Minimum Wage-Fixing Machinery Convention, 1928.

Their ratification and implementation were not carried out, following a 1925 reference to the Supreme Court of Canada which declared that only the provincial legislatures had the competence to do so with the first two conventions, except with respect to federal civil servants and workers in those parts of Canada not within the limits of a province. The decision in that ruling was unanimous.

In 1935, the Parliament of Canada ratified the conventions, and subsequently passed:

 The Weekly Rest In Industrial Undertakings Act,
 The Minimum Wages Act, and
 The Limitation of Hours of Work Act.

This change in position followed the Privy Council's decision in the Aeronautics Reference, which declared:

As there was debate as to whether the Parliament had the competence to pass these Acts, reference questions were given to the Supreme Court as to in what particular or to what extent each of them was ultra vires.

Reference to the Supreme Court of Canada
The Court was evenly divided, 3-3, on each of the questions.

Duff CJ, holding that all Acts were intra vires, as the conventions arose from the Treaty of Versailles, said:

In his dissent, Rinfret J (as he then was) argued that the conventions were separate and did not arise as a consequence of the Treaty, the 1925 Reference was binding, and moreover that they were not properly ratified at all, declaring:

Appeal to the Privy Council
The Board held that all Acts were ultra vires. In his ruling, Lord Atkin held:

 "The obligations [arising from the conventions] are not obligations of Canada as part of the British Empire, but of Canada, by virtue of her new status as an international person, and do not arise under a treaty between the British Empire and foreign countries."
 "No obligation to legislate in respect of any of the matters in question arose until the Canadian executive, left with an unfettered discretion of its own volition, acceded to the conventions, a novus actus not determined by the [Treaty of Versailles]."
 "For the purposes of sections 91 and 92 [of the BNA Act] ... there is no such thing as treaty legislation as such."
 "The question is not how the obligation is formed, that is the function of the executive: but how is the obligation to be performed and that depends upon the authority of the competent legislature or legislatures."

Even though the Statute of Westminster 1931 had made Canada fully independent in governing its foreign affairs, the Board held that s. 132 did not accordingly evolve to take that into account. As noted at the end of the judgment,

Aftermath

Labour relations
The scope of the federal jurisdiction with respect to labour relations, as determined by the 1925 reference, continued to apply until 1955, when the Stevedores Reference held that it extended to all works and undertakings falling under it. In that judgment, Abbott J declared:

Federalism

The Reference served to promote the concept of dual federalism, where the provinces could act as separate communities within a wider political union. As a result, spillover effects by an Act passed by one level of government onto the other level are not tolerated, and are dealt with by the courts through declaring the measure to be ultra vires, or "read down" so that it remains within the jurisdiction of the originating legislature.

As to its general effect on federal and provincial jurisdiction, it has been suggested that the "watertight compartments" doctrine, generally construed as stating that nothing can be added or taken away, may be more properly described as meaning that a head of power can encompass more than it did at the beginning of Canadian Confederation in 1867, but it should not encompass less. The Supreme Court in 2011 summarized its present approach in Reference re Securities Act:

External relations
The Reference expressly left undecided the question as to the extent of the federal power to negotiate, sign and ratify treaties that deal with areas falling within provincial jurisdiction.

After 1949, the Supreme Court tended to side more with the federal government, and in 1955 subsequently ruled that international agreements between provinces and foreign governments were allowed only if they did not involve treaty obligations but merely reciprocal or concurrent legislative action.

This judgment has generated extensive debate about the complications that were introduced in implementing Canada's subsequent international obligations, and it has been condemned for being out of touch with Canadian economic and political realities. The Supreme Court of Canada has indicated in several dicta that it may be ready to revisit the issue in an appropriate case.

An indication that that may eventually happen came in a comment by Dickson CJ in 1987:

Further reading

Notes

References

Canadian federalism case law
Judicial Committee of the Privy Council cases on appeal from Canada
1937 in Canadian case law
Canadian labour case law
Canadian constitutional case law
Supreme Court of Canada cases